Historic Senior Hall on the Stephens College campus in Columbia, Missouri dates back to 1841, when Oliver Parker bought the eight-acre tract of land on which the College was first located. In 1857, the Columbia Baptist Female College, which later became Stephens College, acquired the building. Until 1918, Historic Senior Hall was the only dormitory at the College. It was the tradition for the President of the Civic Association (now the Student Government Association) to occupy the first floor room just north of the Waugh Street entrance. A complete restoration of Historic Senior Hall began in the spring of 1987, and the building was rededicated in the spring of 1990. The historic auditorium was demolished as a cost saving measure in 2000.

Senior Hall was placed on the National Register of Historic Places in 1977.

References

University and college buildings on the National Register of Historic Places in Missouri
School buildings completed in 1841
Buildings and structures in Columbia, Missouri
Stephens College
National Register of Historic Places in Boone County, Missouri
Individually listed contributing properties to historic districts on the National Register in Missouri
1841 establishments in Missouri
Demolished buildings and structures in Columbia, Missouri
Religion in Columbia, Missouri